Frank John Hughes (born November 11, 1967) is an American film and television actor, and screenwriter. Hughes is best known for his portrayals of "Wild Bill" Guarnere in the HBO miniseries Band of Brothers, Tom Fox in Catch Me If You Can, Tim Woods in 24, and Walden Belfiore in The Sopranos.

Early life
A native of the South Bronx Hughes is of half Italian-half Irish descent. He studied jazz composition at the Berklee College of Music in Boston. At the age of nineteen, he became one of the youngest members ever to be given lifetime membership in the Actors Studio. He also studied with acting teacher Sonia Moore. After numerous stage productions Off-Broadway, Hughes made his feature film debut in Robert Celestino's True Convictions (1991).

Career
Following his first appearance in True Convictions, Hughes has starred in such films as: Bad Boys (1995), Lonely in America (1991), The Funeral (1996) opposite Benicio del Toro and Christopher Walken, Layin' Low (1996), Mr. Vincent (1997), Urban Jungle (1999), Robbers (2000), Anacardium (2001) (for which he won "Best Actor" at the New York Independent Film Festival), and Steven Spielberg's Catch Me If You Can (2002). He also appeared in Yonkers Joe and Righteous Kill (2008). In 2009, Hughes joined the cast of the series 24 as Secretary of Homeland Security, Tim Woods. He reprised the role for the season released in 2010.

Hughes wrote, produced and starred in Leave (2011). In 2013 he wrote and produced Dark Tourist starring Michael Cudlitz and Melanie Griffith. That same year, Hughes signed a two-picture deal with Warner Bros. to adapt Shovel Ready into a feature film starring Denzel Washington, as well as to write a screenplay for a project titled Tier 1.

Filmography

Television
as Actor

Other appearances include: Cover Me, Law & Order, Homicide: Life on the Street, Feds, Without a Trace, Monk, Boomtown, Kings of South Beach, Curb Your Enthusiasm, JAG, The Path to 9/11, Law & Order: Criminal Intent, NCIS, and Criminal Minds.

as Screenwriter

Video game

References

External links

 

1967 births
American people of Italian descent
Male actors from New York City
American male film actors
American male television actors
Living people
Writers from the Bronx